Rushden & Diamonds Football Club was an association football club based in Irthlingborough, Northamptonshire, England. The club was formed by a merger of Southern Football League side Rushden Town and United Counties league side Irthlingborough Diamonds in 1992. Rushden & Diamonds played in the Conference National following a short spell in the Football League at the start of the 2000s. The club were expelled from the Conference National on 11 June 2011. Their unstable financial position meant they could not guarantee to complete all their fixtures in the then upcoming 2011–12 season, and resulted in their dissolution in 2011.

Key

Key to league record
 Level = Level of the league in the current league system
 Pld = Games played
 W = Games won
 D = Games drawn
 L = Games lost
 GF = Goals for
 GA = Goals against
 GD = Goals difference
 Pts = Points
 Position = Position in the final league table
 Top scorer and number of goals scored shown in bold when he was also top scorer for the division.

Key to cup records
 Res = Final reached round
 Rec = Final club record in the form of wins-draws-losses
 PR = Preliminary round
 QR1 (2, etc.) = Qualifying Cup rounds
 R1 (2, etc.) = Proper Cup rounds
 QF = Quarter-finalists
 SF = Semi-finalists
 RU = Runners-up
 W = Winners

Seasons

References

English football club seasons